The 1999 Nigerian Senate election in Oyo State was held on February 20, 1999, to elect members of the Nigerian Senate to represent Oyo State. Brimmo Yusuf representing Oyo North, Lekan Balogun representing Oyo Central and Peter Olawuyi representing Oyo South all won on the platform of the Alliance for Democracy.

Overview

Summary

Results

Oyo North 
The election was won by Brimmo Yusuf of the Alliance for Democracy.

Oyo Central 
The election was won by Lekan Balogun of the Alliance for Democracy.

Oyo South 
The election was won by Peter Olawuyi of the Alliance for Democracy.

References 

February 1999 events in Nigeria
Oyu
Oyo State Senate elections